Erika Ritchie is a Canadian politician, currently representing the riding of Saskatoon Nutana in the Legislative Assembly of Saskatchewan.

Political career 
Ritchie's first foray into politics was as a candidate for the New Democratic Party in the 2019 federal election for the riding of Saskatoon-Grasswood. There she lost to incumbent Kevin Waugh.

Ritchie ran for the Saskatchewan New Democratic Party in the 2020 Saskatchewan general election in a bid to replace the retired Cathy Sproule as MLA for Saskatoon Nutana. She was elected on October 26, securing 65% of the vote.

On November 4, 2020, Ritchie, formerly an environmental engineer, was named NDP critic for environment, energy and resources, SaskEnergy, SaskWater, and the Water Security Agency.

Personal life 
Ritchie studied engineering at the University of Saskatchewan. In June 2019, Ritchie was elected to the board of directors for Saskatoon Co-op. Ritchie was endorsed by the grassroots group Co-op Members for Fairness, which started in support of Co-op workers during a prolonged strike over a tiered-wage system.

Electoral results

References 

Living people
Politicians from Saskatoon
Saskatchewan New Democratic Party MLAs
21st-century Canadian women politicians
1969 births